Odontosagda blandii is a species of air-breathing land snail, a terrestrial pulmonate gastropod mollusk in the family Sagdidae.

Distribution 
This species occurs in Port-au-Prince in Haiti.

References 

Sagdidae
Gastropods described in 1880